Tragic Wedding (Spanish:Bodas trágicas) is a 1946 Mexican drama film directed by Gilberto Martínez Solares and starring Roberto Silva, Miroslava and Ernesto Alonso. The film's sets were designed by the art director Jorge Fernandez.

The film marked the screen debut of Miroslava a Czech refugee who became one of the leading stars of Mexican Cinema.

Cast
 Roberto Silva as Diego  
 Miroslava as Amparo  
 Ernesto Alonso as Octavio  
 Estela Inda as Laura 
 José Morcillo as Don Juan Manuel  
 Antonio R. Frausto as Sostenes  
 Alberto Torres Lapham as Don José Luis  
 Lupe Inclán as Agustina  
 Carolina Barret as Pepita  
 Luis Beristáin as Carlos  
 Manuel Noriega Ruiz as Padre Muñoz  
 José Elías Moreno as Coronel Torres 
 María Valdealde as Doña Engracia

References

Bibliography 
 Frank Javier Garcia Berumen. Brown Celluloid: 1894-1959. Vantage Press, 2003.

External links 
 

1946 films
1946 drama films
Mexican drama films
1940s Spanish-language films
Films directed by Gilberto Martínez Solares
Mexican black-and-white films
Films scored by Manuel Esperón
1940s Mexican films